Jonathan "Jonty" Clarke (born in Essex) is an English field hockey player who plays as a forward.

Competing for England and Great Britain at numerous tournaments, he represented Great Britain in Field hockey at the 2008 Summer Olympics and at the 2012 Summer Olympics.

Clarke was brought up in the town of Southend and was educated at Southend High School for Boys and was a prominent hockey player there. Many have followed in Jonty's footsteps and become great players, many representing Essex. SHSB said that they believed Jonty is the second pupil to ever represent Team GB at the Olympics after Mark Foster.

After his performance at the 2008 Olympics, Jonty Clarke became the first accountant to win the Echo's Southend Sports Personality of the Year.  He attributed his success partly to his employer BDO, for which he works for on a part-time basis.

External links
 
 
 
 
 Profile at GreatBritainHockey.co.uk

1981 births
Living people
English male field hockey players
British male field hockey players
Male field hockey forwards
Olympic field hockey players of Great Britain
Field hockey players at the 2006 Commonwealth Games
2006 Men's Hockey World Cup players
Field hockey players at the 2008 Summer Olympics
2010 Men's Hockey World Cup players
Field hockey players at the 2012 Summer Olympics
People from Rochford
People educated at Southend High School for Boys
Reading Hockey Club players
Commonwealth Games competitors for England